Palghar District (Marathi pronunciation: [paːlɡʱəɾ]) is a district in the state of Maharashtra in Konkan Division.

On 1 Aug 2014, the State government of Maharashtra announced the formation of the 36th district of Maharashtra Palghar, it was partitioned out of the  Thane district. Palghar District starts from Dahanu at the north and ends at Naigaon. It comprises the talukas of Palghar, Vada, Vikramgad, Jawhar, Mokhada, Dahanu, Talasari and  Vasai. At the 2011 Census, the talukas now comprising the district had a population of 2,990,116.

Palghar has an urban population of 1,435,210, that is 48% of total population is living in Urbanized Area. Palghar has all the three categories of the lifestyles, Urban (Nagari), Coastal (Sagari) and Mountains-Hilly Region (Dongari). Palghar District is blessed by beautiful beaches as it is the part of konkan such as "Shirgaon Beach", "Kelve Beach'', "Vadrai Beach", "Dahanu Beach", "Bordi Beach", "Chinchani Beach", "Arnala Beach", "Rajodi Beach", "Suruchi Beach" etc. The district is bounded by Thane and Nashik districts in the east and northeast, and by the Valsad district of Gujarat state and the Dadra and Nagar Haveli district of the Dadra and Nagar Haveli and Daman and Diu union territory in the north. The Arabian Sea forms the western boundary, while the whole district falls under the fastest developing northern part of Mumbai Metropolitan Region.

Officer

Members of Parliament

Rajendra Gavit (BSS)

Guardian Minister

list of Guardian Minister

District Magistrate/Collector

list of District Magistrate / Collector

History
Until 1 August 2014, the talukas now comprising Palghar District formed a part of Thane District. After a struggle and demand for almost 25 years, for bifurcation, the creation of the new district was approved by the Cabinet of Maharashtra on 13 June 2014 and the new district of Palghar came into existence on 1 August.

Geography
The district is the northernmost part of the Konkan lowlands of Maharashtra. It comprises the wide amphitheater like Ulhas basin on the south and hilly Vaitarna valley on the north together with plateaus and the slopes of Sahyadri. From the steep slopes of the Sahyadri in the east, the land falls through a succession of plateaus in the north and centre of the district to the Ulhas valley in the south. The distance from the parts of different palaces to headquarters Palghar by road is as follows: Khodala 138 km, Mokhada 112 km, Jawhar 75 km, Vikramgad 60 km.

The main river flowing through the district is the Vaitarna. The river has many tributaries; the most important of them are Barvi and Bhatsa, Pinjal, Surya, Daherja and Tansa. Vaitarna, the largest of Konkan Rivers rises in the Trimbakeshwar hills in Nashik district, opposite to the source of Godavari. The river flows across Shahapur, Vada and Palghar talukas and enter the Arabian Sea through a wide estuary off Arnala. Vaitarna River is 154 km long and has a drainage area that practically covers the entire northern part of the district. In Palghar many students come for studying from outer areas.

Ulhas river which flows to Arabian sea is Vasai creek, district's southern border.

Arnala Island is located in Vasai taluka, at the entrance to the Vaitarna estuary.

Climate

Divisions
Palghar has an urban population of 1,435,210, that is 48% of total population is living in Urbanized Area. Palghar District comprises 8 talukas. The talukas, with their populations at the 2001 and 2011 Censuses  are as follows:

Municipal Corporations in Palghar District
 Vasai-Virar

Municipal Councils in Palghar District
 Palghar
 Jawhar
 Dahanu

Newly Formed Nagar Panchyats in Palghar District

 Mokhada
 Vikramgad
 Talasari 
 Vada

Constituencies
There are six Vidhan Sabha constituencies in Palghar district, grouped into one Lok Sabha constituency; Dahanu (ST), Vikramgad (ST), Palghar (ST), Boisar (ST), Nalasopara and Vasai constituencies are part of Palghar Lok Sabha constituency. Rajendra Dhedya Gavit from Shiv Sena is the member for Palghar of the 17th Lok Sabha.

Demographics

At the time of the 2011 census, Palghar district had a population of 2,990,116, of which 1,561,438 (52.22%) lived in urban areas. Palghar had a sex ratio of 934 females per 1000 males. Scheduled Castes and Scheduled Tribes made up 2.91% and 37.39% of the population respectively.

Religion

Languages

According to the 2011 census, 61.96% of the population spoke Marathi, 15.33% Hindi, 6.12% Varli, 5.61% Gujarati, 1.76% Urdu, 1.75% Bhojpuri and 1.01% Marwari as their first language.

Transportation 

The Western Railway network passes through Vasai, Palghar and Dahanu talukas of the district. The Western Express Highway (NH48) has passed through manor and chilhar for enter in Palghar district.

Economy 

Palghar has India's first atomic power plant located at Tarapur. The industrial town of Boisar is also home to one of Maharashtra's largest industrial areas at Tarapur MIDC. Maharashtra's largest fishing port is Satpati; Dahanu, Arnala, Vasai and Datiware are also major fishing ports. Dahanu is best known for their chickoo production in the whole of India. A special Chickoo festival is held every year at Bordi beach in Dahanu.

MSEDCL supplies electricity to all urban and rural areas across the district. Gujarat Gas has been authorized in April 2015 to supply compressed natural gas and piped natural gas to all urban and rural areas across the district.

Tourist Places
The Vasai Taluka of Palghar district is a melting pot of Multi Cultural & Multi religious populace. The Portuguese footprints has left its cultural mix in this area. 
This taluka has about 9 big Churches built during 1564 AD. which are a great tourist attraction. The Buddha Stupa near NallaSopara West is also a great historic place. The Nirmal Lake is a sacred place in Vasai, which dates back to Shri Parshuram time. 
There are hill stations and beaches in the district which are the major tourist attractions. Some of the major tourist attractions are
Tansa Wildlife Sanctuary
Mahalakshmi Temple at Kasa(Dahanu)
Dahanu Beach
Bordi Beach
Vasai Fort
Tandulwadi Fort
Jawhar Hill station
Suryamal Hill Plateau
Deobandh kendra
Dabhosa Water fall(Jawhar)
Arnala Fort
Kelwa Beach
Bhavangad Fort
Mahim Beach
Mahim Fort
Vajreshwari Hot water springs
Ganeshpuri Temple
Jiwdani temple (Virar)
Kohoj Fort
kelwa dam

See also
 2020 Palghar mob lynching
 Tarapur Vidya Mandir & Jr. College

References

External links 

 Official website

 
Districts of Maharashtra
2014 establishments in Maharashtra